This is a list of African-American newspapers that have been published in the state of Minnesota. It includes both current and historical newspapers.  The first such newspaper published in Minnesota was the Western Appeal, established in 1885.  African-American newspapers currently published in Minnesota include Insight News and the Minnesota Spokesman-Recorder.

Newspapers

See also 
List of African-American newspapers and media outlets
List of African-American newspapers in Iowa
List of African-American newspapers in Wisconsin
List of newspapers in Minnesota

Works cited

References 

Newspapers
Minnesota
African-American
African-American